"Scanners Live in Vain" is a science fiction short story by American writer Cordwainer Smith (pen name of American writer Paul Linebarger). It was the first story in Smith's Instrumentality of Mankind future history to be published and the first story to appear under the Smith pseudonym. It first appeared in the semi-professional magazine Fantasy Book.

Significance
"Scanners Live in Vain" was judged by the Science Fiction Writers of America as one of the finest science fiction short stories prior to 1965 and, as such, was included in the anthology The Science Fiction Hall of Fame, Volume One, 1929–1964. The story was nominated for a Retro-Hugo award for Best Novelette in 2001. It has been published in Hebrew, Italian, French, Croatian, German and Dutch translations.

Plot summary
Conscious humans cannot travel through space because of an effect called the "Great Pain of Space", which eventually causes death, so space travel is possible only in artificial hibernation. Ships are crewed by "habermans", convicted criminals who have undergone a surgical procedure to sever almost all sensory nerves, rendering them unable to hear, smell or feel, although they can still see. A haberman monitors and controls his bodily functions via a box of electronic instruments implanted in his chest, and communicates by writing on a tablet. In space, habermans are supervised by Scanners, people who have voluntarily undergone the same surgery. Unlike habermans, Scanners are widely honored for their self-sacrifice which makes space travel possible.

Martel is a Scanner who is, unusually, married to a normal woman. He has just "cranched", a process which temporarily restores his senses to a state of normality. The Scanners' leader Vomact calls an emergency meeting of all Scanners, and requires Martel to attend, even though his cranched state would normally excuse him from a meeting. Vomact reveals that a scientist named Adam Stone will soon make public a method to circumvent the Great Pain of Space and allow space travel for normal humans. Since this will make the Scanners redundant, he proposes that Stone should be killed. After lengthy discussion, the Scanners vote to do so.

Martel and Martel's friend Chang object to this plan, but Chang refuses to defy the vote. He tells Martel that another of Martel's friends, Parizianski, has been chosen to kill Stone. Martel travels to Stone's apartment to warn him. Parizianski appears, and Martel reluctantly kills him. Over time, the Scanners are surgically restored to normality and become spaceship pilots, retaining their guild and prestige. The failed murder plot is covered up by explaining that Parizianski died because he neglected to monitor his bodily functions due to his joy in learning of Stone's work.

Background and reception
"Scanners Live in Vain" was Linebarger's first published science-fiction story other than "War No. 81-Q", which had been published in his high school magazine. (Linebarger had written the latter story at the age of 15.) "Scanners Live in Vain" was written in 1945. It had been rejected a number of times until its acceptance and publication in Fantasy Book in 1950. Fantasy Book was a low circulation obscure semi-professional magazine, but it was noticed by science fiction writer and editor Frederik Pohl. Pohl, who had himself, under a pseudonym, co-authored (with Isaac Asimov) a story which appeared in that issue, was impressed with the story's powerful style and imagery. Pohl republished it in 1952 in the more widely-read anthology Beyond the End of Time. Even then, the true identity of "Cordwainer Smith" remained a mystery and a topic of speculation for science fiction writers and fans. 

Pohl has said that "Scanners Live in Vain" "is perhaps the chief reason why Fantasy Book is remembered".
 Robert Silverberg called it "one of the classic stories of science fiction" and noted its "sheer originality of concept" and its "deceptive and eerie simplicity of narrative". John J. Pierce, in his introduction to the anthology The Best of Cordwainer Smith, commented on the strong sense of religion it shares with Smith's other works, likening the Code of the Scanners to the Saying of the Law in H. G. Wells' The Island of Doctor Moreau.

Graham Sleight lauded Smith's depiction of Martel's cranched perspective, calling it "a story about absence", but faulted his portrayal of Martel's wife Luci, whom he describes as "just a plot device".

Science fiction scholar Alan C. Elms has suggested that the story reflects Smith's own deep psychological pain, symbolized by the "Great Pain of Space" (which is described in terms reminiscent of depression) and the isolation of the Scanners. The outcome of the story can by this interpretation be seen as indicative of his acceptance of help.

A revised text, based on Linebarger's original manuscript, appears in the 1993 NESFA Press collection The Rediscovery of Man (where it is accompanied by a facsimile of his original cover letter) and the 2007 collection When the People Fell.

Notes

External links
Scanners Live in Vain at the Internet Archive.

1950 short stories
Short stories by Cordwainer Smith
Works originally published in American magazines
Works originally published in science fiction magazines
Works originally published in fantasy fiction magazines